Microschismus sterkfontein is a species of moth of the family Alucitidae. It is found in South Africa.

References

Endemic moths of South Africa
Moths described in 2011
Alucitidae
Moths of Africa